René Hausman (21 February 1936 – 28 April 2016) was a Belgian comic-book writer and artist, best known for his dark fairytales and watercolour drawings.

Biography
René Hausman was born in Verviers, Belgium in 1936. After meeting already famed comics author Raymond Macherot when he was 18 years old, he quit his studies and made illustrations for local magazines. A few years later, he started working for Le Moustique, a family magazine from publisher Dupuis. From there, he moved to Spirou, the Franco-Belgian comics magazine of the same publisher, where he contributed in 1957 Saki et Zunie, his first comic, with a story by Yvan Delporte. In the following years, he provided more than 500 illustrations for the magazine, specializing in animals and local folklore, which earned him the nickname "Bard of the Ardennes".

In the following decades, he widened his oeuvre to more adult comics, including erotic fables in the French magazine Fluide Glacial, but he got his major breakthrough in 1985 when he created Laïyna, a fairy story in two parts, the first of which was published as a supplement to Spirou in one week. It became a few years later the first album in Aire Libre, the new graphic novels collection of Dupuis. He later made three more comics for the same series.

Also known as a sculptor and a bagpipe player, Hausman never had a major commercial success, but got wide recognition for his use of colours and the use of the fantastic in his stories. All his stories feature nature and animals, and Hausman himself has lived for all his life on the country. He has been a major influence on many younger Franco-Belgian comics artists, including Frank Pé and Didier Comès. In 1995, he was made an honorary citizen of the city of Durbuy.

Bibliography
This bibliography only mentions the comics by Hausman which have been published as an album, and does for the moment not include his book illustrations, magazine illustrations, and music album covers.

Apart from publications in French and Dutch, his comics also have been translated into German, Spanish and Swedish.

Hausman has also designed different stamps for the Belgian Post, illustrating native animals of the Ardennes. His stamp for the Horses Procession in Opwijk was even praised as the best Belgian stamp of 2002.

Notes

Sources
 Béra, Michel; Denni, Michel; and Mellot, Philippe (2002): "Trésors de la Bande Dessinée 2003–2004". Paris, Les éditions de l'amateur.

External links
Biography at Comiclopedia
Biography at Dupuis

1936 births
2016 deaths
People from Verviers
Belgian comics writers
Belgian comics artists